Andrei Cherkasov was the defending champion and  won in the final 7–6(7–2), 3–6, 7–6(7–5), against Jakob Hlasek.

Seeds

Draw

Finals

Top half

Bottom half

External links
 Draw

Kremlin Cup
Kremlin Cup